East Malling  is a village in the borough of Tonbridge and Malling, Kent, in the part of the civil parish of East Malling and Larkfield lying south of the A20 road. In 2019 the ward had an estimated population of 5478.

History
The earliest recorded reference to East Malling is "in a Charter of King Edmund I (reigned 939 – 946 AD) which refers to ‘East Mealing’, describing a gallows." East Malling was recorded in the Domesday Book of 1086 as Mellingete.

Farming was common in the area until the 1960s especially of hops and fruit orchards, and some of this activity remains today including the East Malling Research Station. After World War II,  Malling Rural District Council developed the Step Stile and Clare Park housing estates.

Amenities
The ragstone church is dedicated to St James the Great, and forms part of a Conservation Area on the High Street.

St James is the primary school and the main secondary school for the area is The Malling School.

Transport
There is a railway station at East Malling with services to Maidstone, Ashford & London.

Media
Much of the location filming for the 1960s BBC comedy programme "Mr Pastry" took place in the countryside around East Malling. Richard Hearne who starred had lived in a neighbouring village, St Mary Platt, and knew the area well.

Nearest settlements

See also
 Bradbourne House
 East Malling Stream

References

External links

East Malling and Larkfield Parish Council
East Malling church
Village website

Villages in Kent
Tonbridge and Malling